The chapters of the manga series Ai Yori Aoshi are written and illustrated by Kou Fumizuki, and was serialized in 1998 in Hakusensha's Young Animal magazine. The first volume was published and released in Japan by Hakusensha on May 28, 1999, with 17 volumes the last was released on December 20, 2005. In English the series was released by Tokyopop. Book one was released in January 2004 with the last book being released in October 2007.

The series has also been licensed in Europe (Non English Releases), Asia, and Middle America. In Europe, the series was licensed in French by Pika Édition, in German by EMA, and in Spanish by Norma Editorial. For Asia the series was licensed in Chinese by Jonesky, in Korean by Daiwon CI, and in Russian by Sakura Press. In Middle America the series has been published in Mexico by Grupo Editorial Vid.

Besides sharing many similarities in the storyline with the two anime series, the manga also expands on parts not covered in the anime, such as Kaoru's younger brother, and Miyabi's past.



Volume list

References

External links

Ai Yori Aoshi
Ai Yori Aoshi